Caim (or Camio) is a Gaelic rendering of biblical  'Cain', who appears in a variation of the fantastical pedigree of Dardanus of Troy that is spun out in Lebor Bretnach, the Middle Irish language recension of the compilation called Historia Brittonum, known in the 9th century version by Nennius. The Lebor Bretnach, greatly modifies the genealogy given in Nennius, making  emendations to earlier sources and tracing the line through Ham rather than Japheth with further spurious names: 
Dardain m. Ioib m. Sadoirn m. Peil m. Palloir m. Zorastres m. Mesraim m. Caim.

In the predominantly Welsh-speaking regions of Wales (Gwynedd, Dyfed and Ynys Mon), Cain, Caio, Caim and Cail are commonplace first names for males. These names are derivatives of an ancient Welsh name "Ca" which is recorded in the book of Welsh folklore called the Mabinogion.

In demonology

Of Cain, originator of murder, consigned to Hell by early Christian writers.

In demonology, Caim appears in Ars Goetia, the first part of Lesser Key of Solomon as a great president of Hell, ruling over thirty legions of demons. Much detail is offered: he is a good disputer, gives men the understanding of the voices of birds, bullocks, dogs, and other creatures, and of the noise of the waters too, and gives true answers concerning things to come.

He is depicted in 19th and 20th century occultist illustrations as appearing in the form of the black bird called a thrush, but soon he changes his shape into a man that has a sharp sword in his hand. When answering questions he seems to stand on burning ashes or coals.

The title 'president' of Hell would suggest a parallel with the presiding officer of a college or convocation, which are the only pre-modern uses of the term. Other authors consider Caim a 'prince' of Hell instead and depict him as a man wearing rich and elegant clothes, and the head and wings of a blackbird.

Demonological directories give an etymology from a supposed Latin word 'Chamos', 'Chamus', said to be a name given to Baal Peor, and possibly corrupted from Hebrew 'Chium', an epithet given to several Assyrian and Babylonian gods. Epigraphy does not confirm this etymology.

See also

 The Lesser Key of Solomon

Sources
S. L. MacGregor Mathers, A. Crowley, The Goetia: The Lesser Key of Solomon the King (1904). 1995 reprint: .

External links
 'The Trojans and Gildas Quartus' traces the growth of some mythic genealogies.

Goetic demons